The Naobaogou Formation is a geological formation in the Daqing Mountains of China. It is likely of Lopingian age. It consists of three rhythms of sediment, labelled members I-III primarily of purple siltstone, but each with a thick basal conglomerate bed. It is notable for its fossil content, producing one of the most diverse Late Permian vertebrate faunas outside Russia and South Africa.

Vertebrate fauna

References 

Permian System of Asia	
Permian China
Lopingian geology